Glucoraphanin is a glucosinolate found in broccoli, mustard and other cruciferous vegetables. 

Glucoraphanin is converted to sulforaphane by the enzyme myrosinase. In plants, sulforaphane deters insect predators and acts as a selective antibiotic.

Synthesis
Glucoraphanin is derived from dihomomethionine, which is methionine chain-elongated twice. The methyl sulfinyl group attached to the five-carbon chain (or four-carbon chain in sulforaphane) is chiral, and has the R configuration. This comes about when 4-methylthiobutylglucosinolate has an oxygen atom added by a flavin monooxygenase.

Research
Sulforaphane and other isothiocyanates have been studied for their potential biological effects. The isothiocyanates formed from glucosinolates are under laboratory research to assess the expression and activation of enzymes that metabolize xenobiotics, such as carcinogens. Observational studies have been conducted to determine if consumption of cruciferous vegetables affects cancer risk in humans, but there is insufficient clinical evidence to indicate that consuming  glucoraphanin and other isothiocyanates in cruciferous vegetables is beneficial, according to a 2017 review.

Plant breeding
Cultivars of broccoli have been bred to contain two to three times more glucoraphanin than standard broccoli. Romanesco broccoli may contain up to ten times more glucoraphanin than typical broccoli varieties. Frostara, Black Tuscany, and red cabbage also contain higher levels of glucoraphanin than broccoli.

References 

Glucosinolates
Brassica oleracea